Hayes Township is a township in Clay County, Kansas, USA.  As of the 2000 census, its population was 206.

Geography
According to the USGS, it contains four cemeteries: Brethren in Christ, Greenwood, Hayes and Pleasant Hill.

Transportation
Hayes Township contains one airport or landing strip, Holmes Airpark.

References
 USGS Geographic Names Information System (GNIS)

External links
 US-Counties.com
 City-Data.com

Townships in Clay County, Kansas
Townships in Kansas